At least two vessels have been named William Rathbone:

  was launched at Liverpool as a West Indiaman. During her career she recaptured a British vessel, and was herself captured by an American privateer, but quickly recaptured by the Royal Navy. Later she traded with Africa, and eventually Calcutta. She burnt at sea in May 1846 when a cargo of jute underwent spontaneous combustion.
The barque wrecked on 11 October 1878 some 10–14 miles north of Hillsboro Inlet, Pompano Beach, Florida.

Citations and references
Citations

References
Cutler, Carl C. (1961) Queens of the Western Oceans: The Story of AMerica's Mail and Passenger Sailing Lines.  (Annapolis: United States Naval Institute). 
 

Ship names